William Richard Motherwell,  (January 6, 1860 – May 24, 1943) was a Canadian politician serving at both the Saskatchewan Legislative Assembly and the Canadian Parliament. He served as Agriculture Minister for both levels of government during his career.

Biography
Born in Perth, Canada West, Motherwell attended the Ontario Agricultural College, graduating in 1881; then worked that summer in Portage la Prairie, Manitoba.  The following year he spring he returned to the prairies joining settlers in who traveled by rail to Brandon, Manitoba, then by red river cart and wagon beyond to the area of  Abernethy, Saskatchewan, where he settled and constructed the  Motherwell Homestead. In 1901, he co-founded and became president of the Territorial Grain Growers' Association. He served in the provincial legislator from 1905 to 1918, Saskatchewan Minister of Agriculture from 1906-1917. His resignation from the provincial legislature was in protest over the provincial Liberal Party's support for conscription and reduction in French language rights.

He first ran as the Liberal candidate for the House of Commons of Canada for the Saskatchewan riding of Assiniboia in a 1919 by-election. Although defeated, he was elected in the riding of Regina in the 1921 federal election. He was re-elected in 1925, 1926, 1930, and 1935 for the riding of Melville. From 1921 to 1930, he was the Minister of Agriculture, except for a short period in 1926.

Legacy

The Motherwell Homestead near Abernethy, Saskatchewan was designated a National Historic Site of Canada in 1966, and is now operated as a museum.

Archives 
There is a William Richard Motherwell and Catherine Motherwell fonds at Library and Archives Canada.

References

External links
 
 
 Serving Agriculture: Canada's Ministers of Agriculture

1860 births
1943 deaths
Liberal Party of Canada MPs
Members of the House of Commons of Canada from Saskatchewan
Members of the King's Privy Council for Canada
People from Perth, Ontario
Persons of National Historic Significance (Canada)
Saskatchewan Liberal Party MLAs